Belfast Bay also known as Passagassawakeag Bay is an inlet of the Penobscot Bay, Gulf of Maine and Atlantic Ocean located by Belfast, Maine in south central Maine.

References

 
Bays of Maine